Wolfgang Amadeus Mozart began his series of preserved piano concertos with four that he wrote at the age of 11, in Salzburg: K. 37 and 39–41. The autographs, all held by the Jagiellonian Library, Kraków, are dated by his father as having been completed in April (K. 37) and July (K. 39–41) of 1767. Although these works were long considered to be original, they are now known to be orchestrations of sonatas by various German virtuosi. The works on which the concertos are based were largely published in Paris, and presumably Mozart and his family became acquainted with them or their composers during their visit to Paris in 1763–64.

By using movements from the sonatas of other composers, the young Mozart seems to have begun to learn how to cope with the structural problems of composing in the piano concerto form. Indeed, it may be that Leopold Mozart had devised this as a compositional teaching method. If so, it seems that this may have been the first time this had been done by the composer. This is perhaps supported by two facts: First, Leopold excluded the first four concertos from his 1768 list, suggesting that he may not have considered them true compositions by his son. Second, the autographs of the four works are the joint products of both Mozart and Leopold (although K. 41 is mainly in Leopold's hand alone).

No. 1 (K. 37) in F major
The concerto is scored for strings, piano (or harpsichord) and pairs of oboes and horns. The three movements are:

The first movement is based on the initial allegro of the sonata for keyboard with violin accompaniment (Op. 1, No. 5) by Hermann Friedrich Raupach, from a set of six published in Paris in 1756. The provenance of the second movement is unknown, although Eric Blom, the editor of the 5th edition of Grove's Dictionary (1954), suggested that it was in fact by Mozart. The final movement is based on the first movement of the sonata, Op. 2, No. 3, by the Strasbourg-based Leontzi Honauer.

No. 2 (K. 39) in B major
The concerto is scored for strings, piano (or harpsichord), and pairs of oboes and horns, as above. The movements are:

The first and third of the movements are again from Raupach (Op. 1, No. 1), whilst the slow movement is based on the opening movement of Johann Schobert's Op. 17, No. 2, a composer admired by Mozart.

No. 3 (K. 40) in D major

The concerto is scored for strings, piano (or harpsichord), and pairs of horns, oboes and trumpets. The movements are:

The first movement is based on the initial movement of Honauer's Op. 2, No. 1. The second on one by Johann Gottfried Eckard (op. 1, no. 4 ), the most famous keyboardist of his day. The third movement is based on C. P. E. Bach's piece La Boehmer, published in the early 1760s. Mozart's cadenzas for the concerto survive.

No. 4 (K. 41) in G major

The concerto is scored for strings, piano (or harpsichord) and pairs of horns and flutes. The movements are:

As all the movements of this concerto are in either G Major or G Minor, the work is homotonal.  In only four other piano concerti by Mozart are the slow movement in a minor 

key (K. 271, K. 456, K. 482, and K. 488).

This concerto also opens in triple meter, an unusual feature of Mozart's 27 Piano Concerti; only K. 41, K. 413, K. 491, and K. 449 open in triple meter.

The first and third movements are based on ones by Honauer (Op. 1, No. 1), and the middle one on Raupach (Op. 1, No. 1).

Assessment

By comparison to Mozart's later concertos or even to those of J. C. Bach, these are slight works. The preludes that Mozart added to the sonatas do not contain a wealth of themes, as is typical for his later efforts, nor does the exposition or middle section add new thematic material. The role of the keyboard as soloist or continuo is not always clearly delineated. Nevertheless, some traces of his later structures can be detected: for example, the relative sizes of the sections is approximately similar, albeit on a smaller scale.

References

Sources
Hutchings, A. A Companion to Mozart's Piano Concertos, Oxford University Press.  
Mozart, W. A. Piano Concertos Nos. 1-6 in full score. Dover Publications, New York.

External links

01-04
1767 compositions